Hoit may refer to:

People
 Albert Gallatin Hoit (1809-1856), American painter
 Henry F. Hoit (1872–1951), American architect

Places
 Hoit, Tajikistan

See also
 Hoyt (disambiguation)